The Fujairah Corniche is a seafront corniche located at the east end of Hamad Bin Abdulla Road in Fujairah City, Emirate of Fujairah, United Arab Emirates, providing recreational facilities for residents and visitors. It is on the coast of the Gulf of Oman in the Indian Ocean.

Al Corniche Road runs along the main corniche seafront. Al Faseel Road continues north behind Fujairah Beach. The Fujairah International Marine Club with a marina is located here. To the south there is a bull wrestling site.

References

Waterfronts
Coasts of the United Arab Emirates
Geography of the Emirate of Fujairah
Tourist attractions in the United Arab Emirates
Fujairah City
Gulf of Oman